Chitturkavu Devi Temple is in the township boundary of Chittur municipality about 15 km from Palakkad town. The eastern side of the ghat is known as ‘ Kongan Nadu'. At a remote time in the history of Malabar, the Kongan army entered Chittur through the mountain pass and a fierce fight followed. In the fight the people of Chittur, with the help of Chittur Goddess could defeat the Kongans. To commemorate the event every year ‘Konganpada' festival is celebrated at the Chitturkavu temple. The goddess Durga in her formidable form is the main deity of the temple. ‘Chanthattom' is the important ritualistic offering of the goddess and as a result of the incessant offering, the idol had turned in to deep black.

The legend about the divine birth of Devi Kali is as follows:- Daruka was a wicked demon. He conquered the three worlds with the miraculous boon that he obtained from Brahma. The Devas suffered much due to continual torment of the demon. Consequently, Lord Siva became angry and out of his fire of anger there existed the goddess Kali, who was entrusted with the work of killing the demon Daruka.  Queen Daruki was the wife of demon and the queen of Forest And she was a devotee of Devi Parvati. The demon shumbh and nishumbha insist to Daruka to insist queen daruki to call Devi Kali ( they don't even know Parvati itself is Kali ) when queen Daruki called Devi Parvati with her devotion. Then Kali got angry with king Darukas behaviour towards women and killed him in spite of his wife's request to forgive him but he got killed as he has insulted the women. From this instance demon shumbh and nishumbha ran away.

Durga temples
Devi temples in Kerala
Hindu temples in Palakkad district